Outcast Souls is a 1928 American silent drama film directed by Louis Chaudet and starring Priscilla Bonner, Charles Delaney and Ralph Lewis.

Cast
 Priscilla Bonner as Alice Davis 
 Charles Delaney as Charles Turner 
 Ralph Lewis as John Turner 
 Lucy Beaumont as Mrs. Mary Davis 
 Tom O'Brien as Officer

References

Bibliography
 Munden, Kenneth White. The American Film Institute Catalog of Motion Pictures Produced in the United States, Part 1. University of California Press, 1997.

External links

1928 films
1928 drama films
Silent American drama films
Films directed by Louis Chaudet
American silent feature films
1920s English-language films
American black-and-white films
1920s American films